Henry Aldrich for President is a 1941 American comedy film directed by Hugh Bennett and written by Val Burton. The film stars Jimmy Lydon, June Preisser, Mary Anderson, Charles Smith, John Litel, Dorothy Peterson and Martha O'Driscoll. The film was released on October 24, 1941, by Paramount Pictures.

Plot

Complications arise when Henry (James Lydon) runs for Centerville High School Students Body President.

Cast 
Jimmy Lydon as Henry Aldrich
June Preisser as Geraldine Adams
Mary Anderson as Phyllis Michael
Charles Smith as Dizzy Stevens
John Litel as Mr. Aldrich
Dorothy Peterson as Mrs. Aldrich
Martha O'Driscoll as Mary Aldrich
Vaughan Glaser as Mr. Bradley
Rod Cameron as Ed Calkins
Kenneth Howell as Irwin Barrett
Lucien Littlefield as Mr. Crosley
Irving Bacon as Mr. McCloskey
Frank Coghlan Jr. as Marvin Bagshaw
Buddy Pepper as Johnny
Dick Paxton as Red MacGowan
Lillian Yarbo as Lucinda
Arthur Loft as Department of Commerce Inspector
Sidney Miller as Sidney

References

External links 
 

1941 films
The Aldrich Family films
Paramount Pictures films
American comedy films
1941 comedy films
Films produced by Sol C. Siegel
American black-and-white films
1940s English-language films
Films directed by Hugh Bennett
1940s American films